Areticulata is a monotypic moth genus of the family Nepticulidae. Its only species, Areticulata leucosideae, is found in South Africa. Both the genus and species were first described by Scoble in 1893.

The larvae feed on Leucosidea sericea. They probably mine the leaves of their host plant.

References

External links

Endemic moths of South Africa
Nepticulidae
Monotrysia genera
Monotypic moth genera
Moths of Africa